Together Again is an album by the American R&B vocal group the Temptations, released on Motown Records in 1987.  It is the group's thirty-fourth studio album, and the first released under the Motown imprint.  All of Motown Records' previous Temptations releases were made on the Gordy label, which was discontinued and whose artist roster and back catalog was consolidated into the main Motown label in 1987.

Overview 
The album's title was inspired by the return of Dennis Edwards to the group, following an absence of nearly four years.  Edwards rejoined the Temptations prior to the recording of the album, replacing Ali-Ollie Woodson as primary lead singer. By the end of 1988, Edwards had departed (for a third and final time), and Woodson returned.

The LP includes the singles "Look What You Started" and "I Wonder Who She's Seeing Now", making it the group's only album to produce multiple Top 10 R&B releases in the 1980s.  The album also included the modest R&B hit "Do You Wanna Go With Me" which was co-written by group members Otis Williams and Ron Tyson alongside Victor Carstarphen, the trio also co-wrote the album track "10 X 10" and both tracks were co-produced by The Temptations. The music video to "I Wonder Who She's Seeing Now" featured Billy Dee Williams and Fred Berry.

A noteworthy fact about this album is that it features the five longest-tenured members of the group.

Track listing
All tracks produced by Peter Bunetta and Rick Chudacoff; tracks 3 and 4 are co-produced by the Temptations.

Personnel 
The Temptations
Dennis Edwards – primary lead, baritone/tenor vocals
Melvin Franklin – bass vocals
Richard Street – tenor vocals, lead on "Everytime I Close My Eyes"
Ron Tyson – tenor/falsetto vocals, lead on "Little Things"
Otis Williams – baritone vocals
Musicians
Robbie Buchanan – keyboards, arranger
Peter Bunetta – drum programming
Rick Chudacoff – keyboards
Paulinho da Costa – timbales
Robert Greenidge – steel drums
Larry Hall, Jerry Hey – trumpets
Dan Higgins – tenor saxophone
Dann Huff, Paul M. Jackson, Jr., David Williams – guitars
Kim Hutchcraft – saxophone
Jerry Peterson – tenor saxophone soloist ("I Got Your Number")
Lon Price – soprano saxophone soloist ("Every Time I Close My Eyes")
John Robinson – drums
Neil Stubenhaus, Freddie Washington – bass guitar
Stevie Wonder – harmonica soloist ("I Wonder Who She's Seeing Now")
Aaron Zigman – keyboards, drum programming, arranger

Charts

Singles

References

External links 
 Together Again at Discogs
 Together Again at Rate Your Music

1987 albums
The Temptations albums
Motown albums